The large blue flycatcher (Cyornis magnirostris) is a species of bird in the family Muscicapidae.
It is found in the eastern Himalayas, from Nepal to Bangladesh. It winters to the northern Malay peninsula.

References

Rasmussen, P.C., and J.C. Anderton. 2005. Birds of South Asia. The Ripley guide. Volume 2: attributes and status. Smithsonian Institution and Lynx Edicions, Washington D.C. and Barcelona.

large blue flycatcher
Birds of Bhutan
Birds of Northeast India
large blue flycatcher
large blue flycatcher